

Administrative and municipal divisions

References

Khakassia
Khakassia